The Federation of General Workers Myanmar (FGWM) is a trade union federation in Myanmar. The federation comprises 20 factory-level trade unions.

History
On October 4, 2019, four FGWM workers were injured when factory owners drove over them in their car after failed labour negotiations in Hlaingthaya Township. Seven months later, officials launched a case against FGWM leaders for wrongful restraint and assault. The leaders said that while they had been present at the negotiations, they were not present when the workers had tried to stop the factory owners from leaving.

On March 28, 2020, during the COVID-19 pandemic, hundreds of FGWM members were let off and their March salary withheld from Myan Mode, a supplier for Zara, Mango and C&A. The let-offs came after workers had refused to work four hours of overtime, fearing a coronavirus infection, and negotiations between union and owners. In response, FGWM workers established a protest camp outside the factory gates, a common union tactic in Myanmar, without blocking access to the factory. On April 3, Myan Mode owners agreed to pay the fired workers' outstanding wages, but the workers continued their camp. Protests at Myan Mode and five other factories were called off in the second half of April. On May 30, FGWM and Myan Mode negotiations led to an agreement that stated 25 union workers would be reinstated immediately, 50 after two months and the rest following the end of the pandemic.

In January 2021, Chinese-owned Hong Yun factory, located in Yangon Region, was shut down after only eight months in operation. The stated reason were cancelled orders, but FGWM suspected owners wanted to get rid of workers. After negotiations with the employer, who had his passport seized by authorities because workers did not trust him, he agreed to pay outstanding wages for December and one month's wages as compensation to each worker. Also in that month, FGWM together with other trade unions called on the Myanmar government to establish a dedicated Labour Ministry in contrast to the existing Ministry of Labour, Employment and Social Security.

Following the 2021 Myanmar coup d'état, FGWM joined the nationwide anti-junta protests. In early March, FGWM chairwoman Moe Sandar Myint said existing agreements signed by international brands did not sufficiently obligate them to ensure that workers at supplying factories would not suffer negative consequences for attending protests.

References

Trade unions in Myanmar
National federations of trade unions